There have been widely varying estimates of proven oil reserves in Russia. Most estimates included only Western Siberian reserves, which have been exploited since the 1970s and supply two-thirds of Russian oil. However, there are potentially huge reserves elsewhere. In 2005, the Russian Ministry of Natural Resources estimated that another  of oil exist in Eastern Siberia. In July 2013, the Russian Natural Resources Ministry made official estimates of reserves available for the first time. According to Russian Natural Resources Minister Sergey Donskoy, as of 1 January 2012, recoverable reserves of oil in Russia under category ABC1 (equivalent to proven reserves) were 17.8 billion tons and category C2 reserves (equivalent to probable and possible) were 10.9 billion tons.

History
Farman Salmanov was an Azerbaijani geologist famous for discovering great oil fields in Western Siberia in Tyumen Oblast in 1961.

Production
Following the collapse of the Soviet Union, Russia's petroleum output fell sharply, and has rebounded only in the last several years. A turnaround in Russian oil output began in 1999, which many analysts attribute to the privatization of the industry. Higher world oil prices, the use of Japanese technology, and the rejuvenation of old oil fields also helped. In 2008, production fell 1 percent in the first quarter and Lukoil vice president Leonid Fedun said $1 trillion would have to be spent on developing new reserves if current production levels were to be maintained. The editor-in-chief of the Russian Petroleum Investor claims that Russian production had reached a secondary peak in 2007.

Over 70 percent of Russian oil production was exported, while the remaining 30 percent was refined locally. In early 2008 Russian officials were reported to be concerned because, after rising just 2% during 2007, oil production started to decline again in 2008. The Russian government proposed tax cuts on oil in an attempt to stimulate production.

It is the second largest exporter of oil in the world.

Reserve estimates

The Russia reserve estimates in the table below were posted in 2006, except that from the US EIA

The ABC1 classification is based on the Russian system, and is that system's closest equivalent to the Society of Petroleum Engineers (SPE) proven reserves. It is regarded by some as somewhat less strict than the SPE proven reserves.

On 29 September 2014, President of the Union of Oil and Gas Producers of Russia Gennady Shmal told a press conference that Russia's discovered oil reserves (ABC1) stand at 17.8 billion tons (17.8 * 1012 m3). He said that C2 reserves stand at 8 billion tons. The Russian designation ABC1 corresponds to proved reserves (proved developed producing, proved developed nonproducing, and proved undeveloped), while C2 corresponds to probable and possible reserves.

Tight oil
Significant reserves of unconventional tight oil such as contained in the Bazhenov Formation are believed to exist in western Siberia. An estimate by Wood Mackenzie of the Bazhenov Formation was that it contained 2 trillion barrels of oil in place; achievable recovery factors are unknown.

See also

 Economy of Russia
 Energy in Russia
 Energy policy of Russia
 Petroleum industry in Russia
 Russia in the European energy sector

References

 
Petroleum in Russia
Russia
Geology of Russia